This is a list of neighbourhoods in the city and province of Mecca in western Saudi Arabia.

List 
Al Faisaliyyah
Ajyad
Al Adl
Al Faisaliyyah
Al Ghassalah
Al Hindawiyyah- commercial center south of the Al Haram District.
Al Iskan - includes the King Fahd Housing complex, A residential district.
Al Jumaizah
Al Maabda
Al Muaisem
Al Nuzha
Al Rasaifah
Al Shoqiyah
Al Shubaikah
Al Sulaimaniyyah
At-Tan'im, which contains Masjid ʿAʾishah, which is used as a miqat for people living in Makkah, who want to perform the pilgrimages of Ḥajj and ʿUmrah
Al Tundobawi
Al Utaibiyyah
Al Zahir
Al Zahra
Al-Khalidiya
Aziziyah
Gazza
Jabal Al Nour
Jabal Omar
Jarwal (Mecca neighborhood)
Jurhum (Mecca neighborhood)
Mina – incorporates the tents, the Jamarat area, and the slaughterhouses just outside the tent city.
Misfalah
Muzdalifah
Shar Mansur

See also 
 Ḥaram
 Holiest sites in Islam
 Middle East
 Arabia

References 

Saudi Arabia geography-related lists
Mecca